"Two Words" is a song by American hip-hop artist Kanye West, that features Mos Def, Freeway and The Boys Choir of Harlem, from West's debut studio album The College Dropout (2004). A cinematic version of the song was released as part of The College Dropout Video Anthology. It has been performed by Freeway regularly at his live shows over the years. An orchestral sound is used in the song. The music video was released in March 2005.

Background
The original version of the track list for The College Dropout showed that the song was initially scheduled to be titled "2 Words" and have the position of number 5, rather than number 18 as it stands on the official release. Featured artist Freeway stated that Kanye wasn't initially respected as a rapper, but, after seeing West's talent, when asked to feature on the album, Freeway's response was: "Hell yeah. Let’s do it."

Composition and lyrics
Within "Two Words", there is an orchestral sound that includes classical strings. Miri Ben-Ari revealed that she was the one who introduced West to this sound, which lead to him falling in love with it. The track contains a sample of 1970 recording "Peace and Love (Amani Na Mapenzi) Movement III (Time)", written by Lou Wilson, Ric Wilson and Carlos Wilson, and performed by Mandrill. On top of this, it samples drums from The 5th Dimension's 1971 track "The Rainmaker".

West references a group he was once in known as the Go Getters with the line: "Go Getters rhyme like, should've been signed twice" and over the years, West has actually recycled multiple rhymes that he first spit when part of the group.

Recording
Miri Ben-Ari revealed that "Two Words" was the first recording she ever did with West. It was revealed by West that he drove to the Harlem Boys Choir's summer camp to record them in a barn for the track. West actually had to pay them $10,000 to record a feature for him. Freeway liked the beat when he heard it, which made him: "want to go ham on it" and the rapper laid his verse down for the song before West and Mos recorded their parts.

In popular culture
An alternative version titled "Two Words (Frisky Remix)" was shared to BBC Music, which is a mashup of the original and Tinie Tempah's Labrinth-featuring single "Frisky", but only Kanye West, Labrinth and Mos Def are included as artists in the remix. On February 27, 2014, Ace Hood released a freestyle titled "Lyrical Exercise" over the instrumental of "Two Words".

Critical reception
Eric Tullis of SPIN described the track as being "the perfect playground for [the three rappers] to break character and address the American reality". It was pointed out by Paul Cantor of Billboard as what is "perhaps the symphonic high point of the record". It received a nomination for Best Hip-Hop Deep Cut at the 2005 Groovevolt Music and Fashion Awards.

Live performances
West and Mos performed "Two Words" live with The Roots as a backing band on September 18, 2004 as part of Dave Chappelle's Block Party concert. Freeway has performed the song at his live shows for years and said himself that: "Everyone loves it." On one occasion, Freeway joined West for a performance of it at a Super Bowl party with Pepsi, which was at the time of Super Bowl XL in February 2006.

Music video
Despite the song not being one of the album's singles, a music video was officially released for it as part of West's The College Dropout Video Anthology on March 22, 2005. He released an edited version of the video independently on November 4.

All of the people who starred in the music video shot their parts in different places. This didn't mark the only time a video was released for a non-single from West's debut album, since he also shot one for "Spaceship", which was posted online by featured artist GLC on June 1, 2009 - however, it was originally scheduled to be released as a single, unlike "Two Words".

Personnel
Information taken from The College Dropout liner notes.
Songwriters: Kanye West, Dante Smith, Leslie Pridgen, Lou Wilson, Ric Wilson, Carlos Wilson
Record producer: Kanye West
Recorders: Marc Fuller, Keith Slattery, Carlisle Young
Mix engineer: Mike Dean
Additional vocals: The Boys Choir of Harlem
Keyboards: Keith Slattery
Violin: Miri Ben-Ari

Cinematic version

On March 22, 2005, The College Dropout Video Anthology was released, which features a bonus audio CD with a cinematic version of "Two Words" as a track on it.

References

External links
"Two Words" lyrics at MTV

2004 songs
Kanye West songs
Mos Def songs
Freeway (rapper) songs
Song recordings produced by Kanye West
Songs written by Kanye West
Songs written by Mos Def
Songs written by Rhymefest
Songs about Chicago